Macrosoma costilunata is moth-like butterfly described by Louis Beethoven Prout in 1916. It belongs to the family Hedylidae. Originally it belonged to the genus Phellinodes.

Distribution
The species is found in the northwest Costa Rica and north and central Ecuador.

Description

Wings
The wings are grayish brown ground color. Forewing is weakly emarginate with dark brown apex. The costa is postmedial with lunate off-white patch. Three small white marks can be found near the apex.
The length of the forewing is 21–22 mm.

Genitalia

Male
Following are the characteristics of the male genitalia:
 Saccus is very short.
 Uncus is apically pointed and is not extending to apex of valva.
 The central element of Gnathos is spinose, downcurved and the lateral components denticulate.
 Valva is narrow, subtriangular and the apex neither upcurved nor upturned.

Female
The female genitalia has the following features:
 Anal papillae is rounded at apices. 
 Signum is denticulate.
 Corpus bursae get widens gradually from ductus.

Antenna
The antenna is not bipectinate in both sexes.

Diagnosis
The single lunate patch on the costa permits this species to be distinguished from M. satellitiata and its relatives. The female of M. costilunata lacks the large white patch of the female of M. nigrimacula.

References
 Macrosoma costilunata - Overview - Encyclopedia of Life.
 Catalogue of Life.
 A catalogue of the Hedylidae (Lepidoptera: Hedyloidea), with descriptions of two new species.
  An identification guide to the Hedylidae (Lepidoptera: Hedyloidea).

Sources

Hedylidae
Butterflies described in 1916
Taxa named by Louis Beethoven Prout
Hedylidae of South America